The following lists events that happened during 1925 in South Africa.

Incumbents
 Monarch: King George V.
 Governor-General and High Commissioner for Southern Africa: The Earl of Athlone.
 Prime Minister: J.B.M. Hertzog.
 Chief Justice: James Rose Innes.

Events

May
 1 – The Prince of Wales arrives in Cape Town on a visit to South Africa.

July
 23 – D.F. Malan, Minister of the Interior, introduces the Areas Reservation and Immigration and Registration Bill, also known as the Asiatic Bill.

Augustus

Unknown date
 Afrikaans officially replaces Dutch as the second official language after English.
 The manor house of Groot Constantia is gutted by a fire.
 The University of Pretoria begins the tradition of Jool in South Africa.
 South Africa returns to the gold standard.

Births
 14 April – Colin Eglin, founding member and leader of the Progressive Federal Party. (d. 2013)
 4 May – Ruth First, journalist, academic and activist. (d. 1982)
 6 June – Andrew Mlangeni, anti-apartheid activist. (d. 2020)
 19 June – Alfred Nzo, anti-apartheid activist. (d. 2000)
 28 September – Cromwell Everson, composer. (d. 1991)
 14 October – Phillip Tobias, palaeoanthropologist. (d. 2012)

Deaths
 30 August – Cathcart William Methven, civil engineer and painter. (b. 1849)

Railways

Railway lines opened
 21 January – Transvaal – Rustenburg to Boshoek, .
 26 May – Transvaal – Magaliesburg to Schoemansville, .
 26 June – Natal – Eshowe to Extension, .
 1 September – Transvaal – Ermelo to Lothair, .
 25 September – Transvaal – Elandshoek to Solarvale (Narrow gauge), .
 1 October – Transvaal – Nylstroom to Vaalwater, .
 14 October – Free State – Senekal to Marquard, .
 19 October – Cape – Kareevlakte to Ladismith, .
 26 November – Free State – Frankfort to Villiers, .
 1 December – Cape – Fort Beaufort to Katberg (Narrow gauge), .

Locomotives
Seven new Cape gauge locomotive types, six steam and one electric, enter service on the SAR. The electric locomotive is the first non-steam mainline locomotive type to enter service in South Africa in quantity.
 A single experimental Class FC Modified Fairlie articulated steam locomotive.
 The first four Class GD branchline 2-6-2+2-6-2 Garratt articulated locomotives.
 The first six of eighteen Class GE 2-8-2+2-8-2 Garratt locomotives.
 A single Class GG 2-6-2+2-6-2 Double Prairie type Garratt on fast mainline passenger service.
 Two American-built Class 15C 4-8-2 Mountain type steam locomotives.
 The first two of seven Class 16D  Pacific type passenger locomotives.
 The first of altogether 172 Class 1E electric locomotives, spread over seven orders, the first mainline electric locomotive to be introduced in South Africa.

References

South Africa
Years in South Africa
History of South Africa